Kondajji Basappa (born 12 November 1915, Kondajji, Davanagere, Karnataka, India; died 14 November 1982, Bangalore, India) was an Indian politician who was the Member of Parliament in the Lok Sabha for Davanagere, Karnataka and a leader in the Karnataka Scouts and Guides movement.

Biography
Kondajji Basappa was a graduate in science from Bangalore University and did his LL.B from Pune University. He took an active role in promotion of Scout and Guide Movement in Karnataka. Basappa entered into politics in the year 1962 by becoming MLA from Davangere and elected twice as a Member of Parliament in 1971 and 1977.
He served as the Union Deputy Minister for Health and Family Planning

Basappa worked as Assistant District Commissioner, District Commissioner of Chitradurga, Assistant State Commissioner of Chitradurga Division and State Secretary before he became State Chief Commissioner. He held this post for the longest period from 1964 till he died in November 1982.

Career highlights
 1942 : Assistant District Commissioner (Scouts) Davanagere
 1946 : President, District Board, Chitradurga
 1948 : Received Gold Medal for Public Service from the Maharaja of Mysore
 1950-1960: Member, Syndicate of the University of Mysore , District Commissioner (Scouts), Chitradurga
 1951 : Indian Representative , 7th World Scout Jamborre at Bad Ischl and World Scout Conference in Austria.
 1955 : Assistant State Commissioner (Scouts), Chitradurga Division 
 1962 : Elected to the Mysore Legislative Assemble from Davanagere ; Deputy Minister for Co-operation, Information and Excise, Mysore
 1962 : Headquarters Commissioner for Public relations, Bharat Scouts and Guides
 1962-1967: Chairman,  State Handloom Advisory Board, State Warehousing corporation
 1963 : State Secretary, Bharat Scouts and Guides
 1964-1982: State Chief Commissioner, 1982 Bharat Scouts and Guides, Karnataka
 1967 : Re-elected to the Mysore Legislative Assembly from Davanagere
 1968 : Awarded the Silver Elephant of the Bharat Scouts and Guides in recognition for his distinguished services to the movement
 1968-1971: Member, Board of Regents University of Agricultural Sciences, Bangalore
 1969 : Secretary, Mysore Pradesh Congress Committee
 1971 : Elected as Member of Parliament (Lok Sabha) from Chitradurga
 1971 : Establishment & Development of Scout and Guide Campus at Kondajji Village
 1972-1974: Union Deputy Minister for Health and Family Planning
 1973 : Indian Delegate to the World Scout Conference at Nairobi
 1974 : Leader of the Indian Team in the International Conference on Family Planning at Manila, Visited Thailand and Hong Kong
 1976 : Donated Rs 1 lakh for the cause of scout and guide movement in Karnataka
 1976 : Founder President of "Jaladarshini jananapeeta" a residential multipurpose Educational Institution, Kondajji Village.
 1977 : Re-elected to the Parliament from Davanagere Davangere (Lok Sabha constituency)
 1982 : Rajyotsava award for the meritorious services rendered to Scouts and Guides movement
 1982 : Died in Bangalore on 14 November.

References
http://www.kondajjibasappa.com/
Davangere (Lok Sabha constituency)

Lok Sabha members from Karnataka
Union deputy ministers of India
1915 births
People from Davanagere district
1982 deaths
India MPs 1971–1977